San Marco 1, also known as San Marco A, was the first Italian satellite. Built in-house by the Italian Space Research Commission (CRS) on behalf of the National Research Council, it was the first of five as part of the Italian-US San Marco programme.

The name of the spacecraft series comes from the San Marco platform, a Jackup barge used as an offshore launch pad for the main phase of the project. San Marco is the patron saint of Venice, often depicted as aiding Venetian sailors.

Development 

In 1961 the Italian government, led by Amintore Fanfani, approved a plan for the development of an indigenous satellite research programme that had earlier been proposed by the CRS. At the time only the Soviet Union and the United States had launched spacecraft into orbit and Italy lacked a suitable launcher and crews trained in firing orbital rockets. As a result, a cooperative plan was developed with the American space agency NASA who would provide the rockets and the launch crew training for Italians to operate them.

The spacecraft was built by members of the CRS, a group of distinguished Italian scientists and engineers including Edoardo Amaldi, co-founder of major European scientific organisations including CERN and ESRO.

The mission was principally a test-flight of a real satellite to gain experience before launches from Italy's own San Marco platform began, the last of 3 phases of the project.

Mission 

The primary mission of the San Marco series was to conduct ionospheric (upper-atmosphere) research. As a test satellite San Marco 1 contained relatively few experiments;

 Atmosphere, an Ion probe.
 Electron-content Beacon, a radio transmitter to study ionospheric effects on long-range radio communication.

Launch 

San Marco 1 was launched by an Italian crew using an American Scout rocket from Wallops Flight Facility, Virginia, US. Launched on 15 December 1964 at 20:24:00 UTC the satellite destructively re-entered the atmosphere on 13 September 1965.

See also 

 San Marco programme
 Italian National Research Council
 Scout rocket
 Wallops Flight Facility
 Broglio Space Centre - formerly San Marco Equatorial Range
 Timeline of artificial satellites and space probes

References

External links 
 NASA NSSDC San Marco 1
 Progetto San Marco Memorabilia

Satellites formerly orbiting Earth
Satellites of Italy
Spacecraft launched in 1964
First artificial satellites of a country
1964 in Italy